is Japanese singer-songwriter Ua's ninth single, released on February 25, 1998. It was used in Yahama Sports Bike commercials. "Milk Tea" debuted at #21 on the Oricon Weekly Singles Chart with 21,690 copies sold. The music video for the song features model and TV personality Mika Ahn. The B-side "Antonio no Uta" is a Japanese-language cover of Michael Franks's "Antonio's Song".

Track listing

CD

Vinyl

Charts and sales

References

External links
 SPEEDSTAR RECORDS | UA 「ミルクティー」

1998 singles
Ua (singer) songs
1998 songs